Protein reversionless 3-like (REV3L) also known as DNA polymerase zeta catalytic subunit (POLZ) is an enzyme that in humans is encoded by the REV3L gene.

The Rev3 subunit interacts with Rev7 to form Pol ζ, a B family polymerase. Pol ζ lacks 3' to 5' exonuclease activity and is a moderate fidelity polymerase. It cannot add nucleotides across from DNA lesions, yet it can extend from primers with terminal mismatches. This makes Pol ζ very important in translesion synthesis (TLS), because it can act in concert with other TLS polymerases that can add across the lesion to complete the bypass of the lesion. Most polymerases have difficulty extending mismatches because they cannot bind properly to the mismatched DNA. So rather than the cell dying, it can survive albeit with a mutation that may or may not be deleterious, so it is believed that Pol ζ is a driving force of evolution.

Interactions
REV3L has been shown to interact with MAD2L2.

References

Further reading